Free School Milk is the first album by the English band Tiny Dancers. It was released on 11 June 2007 in the UK.

Critical reception
PopMatters wrote that "with a proper mixture of bouncy pop songs and acoustically dramatic folk, Tiny Dancers' debut is wholesomely enjoyable due to its strikingly eclectic characteristics." NME called the album "a lovely aural pipe-and-slippers, full of delightful harmonies, jaunty jollity and dewy-eyed sadness in equal measure." The Line of Best Fit called it "an aural delight of wide eyed power pop, country tinged hoedowns and tender balladry."

Track listing
"20 To 9" (4:32)
"I Will Wait For You" (3:11)
"Baby Love" (3:01)
"Shame" (2:43)
"Ashes And Diamonds" (4:20)
"Bonfire of The Night" (2:54)
"Moon Song #2" (5:48)
"Hannah We Know" (3:35)
"Hemsworth Hallway" (3:47)
"Sun Goes Down" (4:56)
"I've Got to Go" (3:23)
"Deep Water" (5:39)

Singles
"I Will Wait For You" (March 2007) UK #36
"Hannah We Know" (May 2007) UK #33

References

2007 albums
Albums produced by John Leckie